Gregor Michel Cailliet is an American scientist who studies the ecology of marine fishes. He is professor emeritus at Moss Landing Marine Laboratories, part of The California State University, having officially retired in 2009.

Education and career 
Cailliet received a B.A. and Ph.D. from University of California at Santa Barbara. He is the author of the books Fishes: A field and laboratory manual on their structure, identification, and natural history and Everyman's Guide to Ecological Living (New York, Macmillan: 1971), as well as many journal articles.

Cladorhiza caillieti, a carnivorous sponge first described in 2014, is named after him.

References

External links
Biography at Moss Landing Marine Laboratories
Biography at The California State University
Publications and citations at Google Scholar

American ecologists
American ichthyologists
California State University faculty
Living people
1943 births
University of California, Santa Barbara alumni
Place of birth missing (living people)